Black clam may refer to:

 Cyclina sinensis
 Arctica islandica

Animal common name disambiguation pages